Dr. Reuven Ramaty (1937—2001) was a Hungarian astrophysicist who worked for 30 years at NASA's NASA Goddard Space Flight Centre. He was a leader in the fields of solar physics, gamma-ray line spectrometry, nuclear astrophysics, and low-energy cosmic rays. Ramaty was a founding member of NASA's High Energy Solar Spectroscopic Imager which has now been renamed the Reuven Ramaty High Energy Solar Spectroscopic Imager in his honour. This was the first space mission to be named after a NASA scientist and was operational from 2002 until 2018. The Online Archive of California holds over 400 entries for documents, papers and photographs published by and of Ramaty and his work. Ramaty made many contributions in the field of astrophysics and solar physics. He was given the Goddard Lindsay Award  in 1980 and had a tribute dedicated to his work at the University of Maryland in 2000.

Early life 
Ramaty was born on February 25, 1937, to two Hungarian parents Michael Miki Reiter and Eliz Ramaty, living in Timișoara, Romania. At 11 years old, his family moved to Israel to escape growing cultural tensions and economic difficulties of the Second World War in 1948. He became the stepson of Gizi Reiter after her marriage to his father. Ramaty remained in Israel for 16 years, where he finished his secondary education and graduated from Tel Aviv University in 1961 with a Bachelor of Science in physics. Ramaty taught physics at a secondary level in Israel before his move to Los Angeles. During his life, Ramaty learnt a total of 8 languages (Hebrew, English, French, Romanian, Hungarian, German, Japanese and Italian).

Education 
In 1964 Ramaty enrolled into the University of California, Los Angeles where he pursued his PhD on planetary and space physics. Ramaty completed his PhD from UCLA in the record time of two years in 1966. Ramaty then joined the NASA Goddard Space Flight Center in 1967 as a post-doctoral research associate. During his career, Ramaty remained active in tertiary education institutions as he was an adjunct professor of physics at the University of Maryland from 1983, where he served as a PhD advisor for six students. Other roles in tertiary education include his time on the doctoral dissertation committee at both the University of Paris (1992) as well as the Pierre and Marie Curie University (1997). Ramaty was also a visiting professor at Nagoya University (1993) and a visiting scientist at California Institute of Technology, Stanford University, University of California Berkeley, University of California San Diego, University of Pennsylvania and Washington University in St. Louis.

Notable work 
Ramaty was a postdoctoral research associate (Laboratory for High Energy Astrophysics), Astrophysicist (Laboratory for High Energy Astrophysics), Head of Theory Office (Laboratory for High Energy Astrophysics), Associate Editor for Physical Review Letters, chairman of the American Physical Society (Astrophysics division), Chairman of the American Physical Society (High Energy Astronomy Division) and, Divisional councillor for astrophysics for the American Physical Society (APS). His most notable work was carried out at the NASA Goddard Space Flight Center, where he worked for over 30 years.

Ramaty was one of the leading scientists in the field of gamma-ray line astronomy as well as devoting his studies to solar flare physics, cosmic rays and flare-accelerated particles. His work has contributed a wealth of information to the literature in the astrophysical field with over 200 published works under his name and with over 5,000 citations to his works as of 2001, Ramaty is credited with the invention of studies regarding the observation of high-energy nuclear reactions in solar flares, as well as the use of gamma-ray line observations of flare-accelerated particles to determine their specific properties. The use of gamma-ray line astronomy at the time was new to the field as it had not been a tool to observe low-energy cosmic rays in interstellar space. With the help of Ramaty's work and his contributions to the field, the observation of Doppler broadenings and shape details from nucleosynthesis events are now possible with the RHESSI solar imager and The Compton Observatory. In addition to this, his work on flare accelerated particles from solar energetic particle events built the foundation for the magnetohydrodynamic simulations which are being used to resolves new paradoxes regarding these particles. Having used these simulations. Ramaty's findings have compared favourably with the observations being made today. With the NASA RHESSI project's observations, Ramaty's early calculations on low-energy cosmic ray lines and theories on solar flare emissions are now being tested, showing his work to be accurate and consistent.

Following the initial discoveries of these observations, Ramaty spent 30 years refining his findings with the Solar Maximum Mission along with the Compton Gamma Ray Observatory. This effort was carried out mainly with the help of Benz Kozlosvsky from Ramaty's alma mater, Tel Aviv University. These discoveries would then lead to Ramaty's theorisation on the origin of low energy cosmic rays. The theory is now generally accepted within the physics community.

Another notable field of study which Ramaty engaged in was the field of gamma-ray line astronomy, where he published seminal works regarding positron annihilation radiation and studies into nucleosynthetic decay and nuclear deexcitation lines. More of this work, with detailed analysis and presentations of his findings, can be found in an article which was co-authored by Ramaty called "Gamma Ray Lines: A New Window to the Universe". The study of positron annihilation radiation and nucleosynthetic decay is used in order to understand band structure and Fermi surfaces in metals.

Ramaty's observations of low-energy cosmic rays follow the findings of R. M. Hjellming in order to build upon our understanding of their origins and how they are able to be observed and imaged with the RHESSI mission and observatories across the world. Ramaty's findings have contributed greatly to the literature in this field of science and the work currently being done credits his papers as crucial research.

Richard E. Lingenfelter says,

"The most notable of those studies was their prediction of interstellar gamma-ray emission in the 1.809-MeV line from the decay of supernova-produced aluminium-26, which was subsequently found with instruments on HEAO-C in 1982 to be the most intense nucleosynthetic line in the Galaxy."

Ramaty's work has been recognised by NASA through his continual efforts and dedication to the field and has honoured him with the renaming of the HESSI mission to RHESSI making it the first NASA mission to be named after a researcher. Ramaty was a crucial part of starting the initiative, and his colleagues note that without his presence, the mission would have never been founded or put into action. RHESSI is the sixth Small Explorer mission from NASA and was launched on February 5 in 2005. [1] NASA's Goddard Space Flight Center Laboratory for Astronomy & Solar Physics review from July 2001 to June 2002 has also mentioned Ramaty's work and states:

"Reuven Ramaty, a GSFC astrophysicist who died in March 2001. Ramaty had a long and distinguished career in the Laboratory for High Energy Astrophysics developing much of the theoretical framework for solar gamma-ray line spectroscopy. He was a founding member of the original HESSI team, and his active involvement and enthusiastic support were critical to the realisation of HESSI and to its selection by NASA for launch during the current maximum in solar activity. This is the first time that a spacecraft has been named after a NASA scientist, and this great honour was recognised at a GSFC ceremony on May 17, 2002."

Achievements 
During his life, Ramaty received a number of significant awards for his work in physics. In 1975 he was awarded the Alexander von Humboldt Foundation the Senior U.S. Scientist Award, the Exceptional Scientific Achievement Award in 1980 from Nasa, Lindsay Award from Goddard Space Flight Centre in 1981 and the 2001 Yodh lifetime Prize just a week before his death. These awards were given mainly for his work with Cosmic Rays and the efforts he put into the literature itself as well as the expansion of knowledge in the field. On December 11, 2000, the University of Maryland hosted "A tribute to Reuven Ramaty's Contributions to High- Energy Solar Physics and Astronomy" which celebrated his works in the field of solar physics as well as acknowledging contributions to his work with solar flare emissions throughout his time at the university.

Notable academic papers and reception 
The Online Archive of California holds a collection of Ramaty's papers. These documents serve as a documentation of his professional career and the work that he carried out as an astrophysicist for the Goddard Space Flight Centre for over 30 years. These works include scientific writings, articles, books, research proposals and proposals for scientific research missions. Beyond his scientific work at Goddard Space Flight Center, the archive also documents conferences organised by Ramaty. As of 2020, there are over 400 documents in The Online Archive of California on Ramaty's work and remains readily accessible to those who visit the Library of Congress institutions across the U.S.

Ramaty's most notable work includes the early predictions and observations of low energy metagalactic cosmic rays which were first published in 1971 and co-authored by Lennard A. Fisk at the Goddard Space Flight Centre. The paper is a foundation on which later findings on low-energy cosmic rays was built on as Ramaty applied previous understandings of universal cosmic ray models produced by Giancarlo Setti. Using this work, Ramaty continued to pursue his studies in low energy cosmic rays and has published multiple papers on the subject, five of which are available on The Online Archive of California. His early work in the field has been credited by Richard Lingenfelter, Neil Gehris and Thomas L. Cline as essential for the current discoveries being made through the RHESSI project. In 1973 Ramaty published his first paper on solar flare nuclear gamma rays where he discussed the observations of gamma-ray line emissions from solar flares and gave estimations in spectrum quantity and proton counts from solar flares through these observations. This work in solar flare emissions is reflected in his later papers from 1973 to 1989, which allowed for closer observations to be made following the launch of the RHESSI project in 2002.

Death 
Ramaty died on April 8 2001 (age 64) in his home in Silver Spring, Maryland, due to complications with Amyotrophic lateral sclerosis. Reuven now rests at the Rockville Judean Cemetery, Maryland, United. His extended family includes his wife and two children in Silver Spring, Maryland.

References

External links
NASA bio
Reuven Ramaty Papers MSS 543. Special Collections & Archives, UC San Diego Library.

20th-century American astronomers
20th-century Hungarian astronomers
1937 births
2001 deaths
Romanian emigrants to Israel
Tel Aviv University alumni
University of California, Los Angeles alumni
Fellows of the American Physical Society
California Institute of Technology people
Washington University in St. Louis people
Stanford University staff
University of California, Berkeley staff
University of California, San Diego people
University of Pennsylvania staff